Manakadavu is a village in Taliparamba taluk of  Kannur district in the Indian state of Kerala, near Karnataka Forest. It is about 56 km from Kannur city. Nearest bus station in Taliparamba at 36 km

Demographics
People here are almost in equal ratio of Hindu and Christians.

Economy
Most people are engaged in agriculture and business. This area exports hill products viz Rubber, dry Copra, Black pepper etc. Manakkadavu is part of Udayagiri Panchayat in Taliparamba Block.

Tourism
The nearest  tourist place is Paithalmala. Nearest mountain range is surrounded by three hills — Kottathalachi, Olakettivana and Thirunettikallu. Kottathalachi Mount is a famous Christian pilgrim. Vayikkamba river in nearest Karnataka forest. Nearest please in manjappullu

Transportation
The national highway passes through Taliparamba town. Goa and Mumbai can be accessed on the northern side and Cochin and Thiruvananthapuram can be accessed on the southern side.  Taliparamba has a good bus station and buses are easily available to all parts of Kannur district.  The road to the east of Iritty connects to Mysore and Bangalore.  But buses to these cities are available only from Kannur, 22 km to the south. The nearest railway stations are Kannapuram  and Kannur on Mangalore-Palakkad line. 
Trains are available to almost all parts of India subject to advance booking over the internet.  There are airports at Kannur, Mangalore and Calicut. All of them are small international airports with direct flights available only to Middle Eastern countries.

See also
 Pythalmala
 Karthikapuram
 Kappimala
 Alakode

References

Villages near Taliparamba